The Secretary of Labor and Employment is the head of the Department of Labor and Employment and is a member of the president’s Cabinet.

The current secretary is Bienvenido Laguesma, who assumed office on June 30, 2022.

List of secretaries of labor and employment

External links
DOLE website

References

 
Labor and Employment